Naimiyeh-ye Seyyed Naser (also Romanized as Na‘īmīyeh-ye Seyyed Nāşer; also known as Na‘mīyeh-ye Nāşer) is a village in Jazireh-ye Minu Rural District, Minu District, Khorramshahr County, Khuzestan Province, Iran. At the 2006 census, its population was 40, in 7 families.

References 

Populated places in Khorramshahr County